Gornje Konjuvce is a village in the municipality of Bojnik, Serbia. According to the 2002 census, the village has a population of 172 people.

References

Populated places in Jablanica District